Lymnaeoidea, common name the pond snails, is  a taxonomic superfamily of small to large air-breathing freshwater snails, aquatic pulmonate gastropod mollusks, that belong to the superorder Hygrophila.

Families
 Acroloxidae Thiele, 1931
 Bulinidae P. Fischer & Crosse, 1880
 Burnupiidae Albrecht, 2017
 Clivunellidae Kochansky-Devidé & Slišković, 1972 †
 Lymnaeidae Rafinesque, 1815
 Physidae Fitzinger, 1833
 Planorbidae Rafinesque, 1815
Families brought into synonymy
 Ancylidae Rafinesque, 1815: synonym of Ancylinae Rafinesque, 1815
 Limnophysidae W. Dybowski, 1903: synonym of Lymnaeidae Rafinesque, 1815 (a junior synonym)
 Rhodacmeidae B. Walker, 1917 : synonym of Ancylinae Rafinesque, 1815(a junior synonym)

References

 Bouchet P., Rocroi J.P., Hausdorf B., Kaim A., Kano Y., Nützel A., Parkhaev P., Schrödl M. & Strong E.E. (2017). Revised classification, nomenclator and typification of gastropod and monoplacophoran families. Malacologia. 61(1-2): 1-526

External links 
 Saadi, A. J.; Davison, A.; Wade, C. M. (2020). Molecular phylogeny of freshwater snails and limpets (Panpulmonata: Hygrophila). Zoological Journal of the Linnean Society

 
Taxa named by Constantine Samuel Rafinesque